Pieter Smith (born April 3, 1987) is a South African sprinter, who specialized in the 400 metres. He set his personal best time of 45.63 seconds by winning the 400 metres event at the 2009 South African Championships in Stellenbosch.

Smith competed for the men's 4 × 400 m relay at the 2008 Summer Olympics in Beijing, along with his teammates L. J. van Zyl, Ofentse Mogawane, and Alwyn Myburgh. He ran on the starting leg of the first heat, with an individual-split time of 45.74 seconds. Smith and his team finished the relay in sixth place for a seasonal best time of 3:01.26, failing to advance into the final.

Smith is also a varsity member for the Nebraska Huskers Track & Field Team, and an economics graduate at the University of Nebraska in Lincoln, Nebraska.

References

External links
 
 Nebraska profile

1987 births
Living people
Athletes (track and field) at the 2008 Summer Olympics
Olympic athletes of South Africa
Nebraska Cornhuskers men's track and field athletes
South African male sprinters
People from Upington